Norman 'Norm' Stevens (born 6 October 1958) is an Indigenous Australian boxer who competed at the 1980 Moscow Olympics in the lightweight division.

1980 Olympic results
Below is the record of Norman Stevens, an Australian lightweight boxer who competed at the 1980 Moscow Olympics:

 Round of 32: lost to Geza Tumbas (Yugoslavia) by decision, 1-4

References

External links 
 
 

1958 births
Living people
Australian male boxers
Indigenous Australian boxers
Indigenous Australian Olympians
Olympic boxers of Australia
Boxers at the 1980 Summer Olympics
Lightweight boxers
People from Innisfail, Queensland